"The Dune" is a short horror story by Stephen King, first published in the Fall 2011 issue of Granta, and later collected in his 2015 short story collection, The Bazaar of Bad Dreams.

Plot summary
In Florida, a retired Florida Supreme Court Judge named Harvey Beecher has a lifelong obsession with a mysterious sand dune on an unnamed island, a short distance off the Gulf coastline of his family's property. Since he was a child and first ventured onto the island looking for buried treasure, he has seen the names of people who are going to die within a month written in the sand. Beecher's lawyer, Anthony Wayland, visits to help Beecher finish his last will. While drawing up the document, Beecher tells about his most recent visit to the dune and the grim recollection of his lifelong experiences with it. The name that Beecher found written in the dune is the reason he now wants his will finished quickly. Wayland assumes Beecher has seen his own name in the sand, but later it is implied the name was Wayland's.

Reception
, readers of the web site Goodreads.com had registered 139 ratings for the story, with an average score of 3.77 out of 5 stars.

References

External links
 

Horror short stories
Short stories by Stephen King
2011 short stories